Little Ferry is a borough in Bergen County, in the U.S. state of New Jersey. As of the 2020 United States census, the borough's population was 10,987, an increase of 361 (+3.4%) from the 2010 census count of 10,626, which in turn reflected a decline of 174 (−1.6%) from the 10,800 counted in the 2000 census.

History
Little Ferry was formed by an act of the New Jersey Legislature on September 18, 1894, from portions of Lodi Township and New Barbadoes Township, based on the results of a referendum held two days earlier. The borough was formed during the "Boroughitis" phenomenon then sweeping through Bergen County, in which 26 boroughs were formed in the county in 1894 alone.

During the colonial era, the borough was the site of an important ferry crossing between the region's towns at Bergen and Hackensack, which was operated by rope on the site starting in 1659, continuing until 1826 when it was replaced by a bridge on the Bergen Turnpike.

Gethsemane Cemetery, an African burial ground, was opened in 1860 and was used for interments until 1924. The site was added to the National Register of Historic Places in 1994.

In the earlier 20th nearby Fort Lee on the Hudson Palisades was home to many film studios of America's first motion picture industry. On July 9, 1937, a major fire broke out in a 20th Century-Fox film storage facility in Little Ferry.

Rosie's Diner (formerly the Farmland Diner) was used in the 1970s for the filming of Bounty paper towel commercials featuring Nancy Walker as Rosie the Waitress.

New Jersey Monthly magazine ranked Little Ferry 35th in its 2008 rankings of the "Best Places To Live" in New Jersey.

Geography
According to the United States Census Bureau, the borough had a total area of 1.67 square miles (4.32 km2), including 1.48 square miles (3.83 km2) of land and 0.19 square miles (0.50 km2) of water (11.44%).

The borough borders the Bergen County municipalities of Hackensack, Moonachie, Ridgefield, Ridgefield Park, South Hackensack and Teterboro.

The borough lies near the confluence of the Hackensack River and Overpeck Creek in the New Jersey Meadowlands.

Demographics

2010 census

The Census Bureau's 2006–2010 American Community Survey showed that (in 2010 inflation-adjusted dollars) median household income was $57,276 (with a margin of error of +/− $6,389) and the median family income was $74,000 (+/− $10,299). Males had a median income of $52,898 (+/− $3,123) versus $40,934 (+/− $3,050) for females. The per capita income for the borough was $29,257 (+/− $2,542). About 4.8% of families and 6.5% of the population were below the poverty line, including 13.1% of those under age 18 and 3.4% of those age 65 or over.

2000 census
As of the 2000 United States census there were 10,800 people, 4,366 households, and 2,785 families residing in the borough. The population density was 7,075.2 people per square mile (2,725.4/km2). There were 4,449 housing units at an average density of 2,914.6 per square mile (1,122.7/km2). The racial makeup of the borough was 68.76% White, 4.71% African American, 0.15% Native American, 17.10% Asian, 0.06% Pacific Islander, 5.75% from other races, and 3.47% from two or more races. Hispanic or Latino of any race were 15.19% of the population.

There were 4,366 households, out of which 27.8% had children under the age of 18 living with them, 49.3% were married couples living together, 10.5% had a female householder with no husband present, and 36.2% were non-families. 31.2% of all households were made up of individuals, and 7.6% had someone living alone who was 65 years of age or older. The average household size was 2.47 and the average family size was 3.16.

In the borough the population was spread out, with 20.2% under the age of 18, 7.4% from 18 to 24, 36.3% from 25 to 44, 23.6% from 45 to 64, and 12.4% who were 65 years of age or older. The median age was 37 years. For every 100 females, there were 95.0 males. For every 100 females age 18 and over, there were 91.7 males.

The median income for a household in the borough was $49,958, and the median income for a family was $59,176. Males had a median income of $42,059 versus $34,286 for females. The per capita income for the borough was $24,210. About 5.9% of families and 6.3% of the population were below the poverty line, including 7.4% of those under age 18 and 6.3% of those age 65 or over.

Government

Local government
Little Ferry is governed under the Borough form of New Jersey municipal government, one of 218 municipalities (of the 564) statewide that use this form, the most common form of government in New Jersey. The governing body is comprised of the Mayor and a Borough Council, with all positions elected at-large on a partisan basis as part of the November general election. A Mayor is elected directly by the voters to a four-year term of office. The Borough Council is comprised of six members elected to serve three-year terms on a staggered basis, with two seats coming up for election each year in a three-year cycle. The Borough form of government used by Little Ferry is a "weak mayor / strong council" government in which council members act as the legislative body with the mayor presiding at meetings and voting only in the event of a tie. The mayor can veto ordinances subject to an override by a two-thirds majority vote of the council. The mayor makes committee and liaison assignments for council members, and most appointments are made by the mayor with the advice and consent of the council.

, the Mayor of Little Ferry is Democrat Mauro D. Raguseo, whose term of office ends December 31, 2023. The Borough Council is composed of Council President Ronald Anzalone (D, 2024), Jenifer Lange (D, 2023), Stephen Lanum (D, 2025), George J. Muller (D, 2024), Thomas Sarlo (D, 2025), and Peggy Steinhilber (D, 2023).

In the 2011 election, Mauro Raguseo was re-elected, defeating Republican Bernard Sobolewski, while council incumbents Roberta Henriquez and Peggy Steinhilber earned new terms in office, fending off Republican challengers Eileen De Leeuw and Stephen Lanum. In the 2010 general election, incumbents Thomas Sarlo and Sue Schuck were re-elected to three-year terms of office, knocking off Republican challengers Foster Lowe and Claudia Zilocchi.

Federal, state and county representation
Little Ferry is located in the 9th Congressional District and is part of New Jersey's 36th state legislative district. Prior to the 2011 reapportionment following the 2010 Census, Little Ferry had been in the 38th state legislative district.

Politics
As of March 2011, there were a total of 5,008 registered voters in Little Ferry, of which 1,511 (30.2% vs. 31.7% countywide) were registered as Democrats, 634 (12.7% vs. 21.1%) were registered as Republicans and 2,860 (57.1% vs. 47.1%) were registered as Unaffiliated. There were 3 voters registered as Libertarians or Greens. Among the borough's 2010 Census population, 47.1% (vs. 57.1% in Bergen County) were registered to vote, including 58.7% of those ages 18 and over (vs. 73.7% countywide).

In the 2012 presidential election, Democrat Barack Obama received 2,024 votes (64.1% vs. 54.8% countywide), ahead of Republican Mitt Romney with 1,091 votes (34.5% vs. 43.5%) and other candidates with 25 votes (0.8% vs. 0.9%), among the 3,159 ballots cast by the borough's 5,344 registered voters, for a turnout of 59.1% (vs. 70.4% in Bergen County). In the 2008 presidential election, Democrat Barack Obama received 2,237 votes (58.2% vs. 53.9% countywide), ahead of Republican John McCain with 1,537 votes (40.0% vs. 44.5%) and other candidates with 38 votes (1.0% vs. 0.8%), among the 3,844 ballots cast by the borough's 5,393 registered voters, for a turnout of 71.3% (vs. 76.8% in Bergen County). In the 2004 presidential election, Democrat John Kerry received 2,064 votes (54.9% vs. 51.7% countywide), ahead of Republican George W. Bush with 1,645 votes (43.8% vs. 47.2%) and other candidates with 29 votes (0.8% vs. 0.7%), among the 3,759 ballots cast by the borough's 5,335 registered voters, for a turnout of 70.5% (vs. 76.9% in the whole county).

In the 2013 gubernatorial election, Republican Chris Christie received 62.7% of the vote (1,226 cast), ahead of Democrat Barbara Buono with 36.6% (716 votes), and other candidates with 0.7% (13 votes), among the 2,012 ballots cast by the borough's 5,051 registered voters (57 ballots were spoiled), for a turnout of 39.8%. In the 2009 gubernatorial election, Democrat Jon Corzine received 1,160 ballots cast (52.1% vs. 48.0% countywide), ahead of Republican Chris Christie with 908 votes (40.8% vs. 45.8%), Independent Chris Daggett with 114 votes (5.1% vs. 4.7%) and other candidates with 13 votes (0.6% vs. 0.5%), among the 2,225 ballots cast by the borough's 5,180 registered voters, yielding a 43.0% turnout (vs. 50.0% in the county).

Education
The Little Ferry Public Schools serve students in kindergarten through eighth grade. As of the 2018–19 school year, the district, comprised of two schools, had an enrollment of 900 students and 78.6 classroom teachers (on an FTE basis), for a student–teacher ratio of 11.5:1. The district's two school buildings are located across the street from each other. Schools in the district (with 2018–19 enrollment data from the National Center for Education Statistics) are 
Washington Elementary School with 466 students in grades Pre-K–4 and 
Memorial Middle School with 401 students in grades 5–8.

Since Little Ferry does not have its own high school, students in public school for ninth through twelfth grades attend Ridgefield Park High School, in Ridgefield Park only a couple of minutes away, as part of a sending/receiving relationship with the Ridgefield Park Public Schools that has been in place since 1953. As of the 2018–2019 school year, the high school had an enrollment of 1,196 students and 89.0 classroom teachers (on an FTE basis), for a student–teacher ratio of 13.4:1.

Public school students from the borough, and all of Bergen County, are eligible to attend the secondary education programs offered by the Bergen County Technical Schools, which include the Bergen County Academies in Hackensack, Applied Technology High School, located at Bergen Community College in Paramus, and the Bergen Tech campus in Teterboro, Paramus. The district offers programs on a shared-time or full-time basis, with admission based on a selective application process and tuition covered by the student's home school district.

Transportation

Roads and highways

The Little Ferry Circle connected U.S. Route 46 and Bergen Turnpike. The circle was originally constructed in 1933 in conjunction with the nearby Route 46 Hackensack River Bridge, which crosses the river to Ridgefield Park and beyond to the George Washington Bridge.The circle was largely reconstructed in 1985, allowing vehicles traveling on Route 46 to pass directly through the circle. The circle has been a constant site of accidents, with 40-50 accidents per year at the circle each year from 2004 through 2006. In March 2007, the New Jersey Department of Transportation proposed its latest plan to address issues at the circle. The plan would realign the circle into a straight intersection, complete with turning lanes; prohibit left turns onto many residential streets; and would include construction of a pump station to move water off the oft-flooded highway and into the Hackensack River. This plan was later completed, with the circle no longer in existence.

Public transportation
NJ Transit bus routes 161 and 165 provide service between Little Ferry and the Port Authority Bus Terminal in Midtown Manhattan, with local service on the 772 route.

The base is privately owned.

Notable people

People who were born in, residents of, or otherwise closely associated with Little Ferry include:

 Tom Boisture (1931–2011), American football high school / college coach and NFL scout who was the head of player personnel for the New York Giants 
 Oscar Gamble (1949–2018), former outfielder / designated hitter who played for the New York Yankees
 Phil Hawes (born 1989), mixed martial artist who competes in the Middleweight division of the Ultimate Fighting Championship
 Bill Lovett (1894–1923), gangster
 Ambar Lucid (born 2001), singer-songwriter, musician
 Margherita Marchione (1922–2021), nun, writer, teacher and apologeticist, who dedicated herself in her later years to the defense of Pope Pius XII and his failure to save more Jews from the Nazis during The Holocaust
 Pete Michels (born 1964), animation director, whose credits include The Simpsons, Family Guy and Rick and Morty
 Chico Resch (born 1949), retired ice hockey goaltender and television sportscaster who played 14 seasons in the NHL for the New York Islanders and New Jersey Devils
 Buddy Valastro (born 1977), star of Cake Boss, who was presented with the "keys to the city" of Little Ferry in 2010

References

Sources

 Municipal Incorporations of the State of New Jersey (according to Counties) prepared by the Division of Local Government, Department of the Treasury (New Jersey); December 1, 1958.
 Clayton, W. Woodford; and Nelson, William. History of Bergen and Passaic Counties, New Jersey, with Biographical Sketches of Many of its Pioneers and Prominent Men. Philadelphia: Everts and Peck, 1882.
 Harvey, Cornelius Burnham (ed.), Genealogical History of Hudson and Bergen Counties, New Jersey. New York: New Jersey Genealogical Publishing Co., 1900.
 Van Valen, James M. History of Bergen County, New Jersey. New York: New Jersey Publishing and Engraving Co., 1900.
 Westervelt, Frances A. (Frances Augusta), 1858–1942, History of Bergen County, New Jersey, 1630–1923, Lewis Historical Publishing Company, 1923.

External links

 Little Ferry official website
 Little Ferry Public Schools
 
 School Data for the Little Ferry Public Schools, National Center for Education Statistics
 Ridgefield Park High School

 
1894 establishments in New Jersey
Borough form of New Jersey government
Boroughs in Bergen County, New Jersey
New Jersey Meadowlands District
Populated places established in 1894
New Jersey populated places on the Hackensack River